Wang Chan is a district (amphoe) in the northern part of Rayong province, eastern Thailand.

History
The minor district (king amphoe) Wang Chan was created on 16 November 1977 by splitting off the two tambons Chum Saeng and Wang Chan from Klaeng district. It was upgraded to a full district on 19 July 1991.

Geography
Neighboring districts are (from the east clockwise) Khao Chamao, Klaeng, Mueang Rayong, Ban Khai and Pluak Daeng of Rayong Province, and Nong Yai and Bo Thong of Chonburi province.

Administration
The district is divided into four sub-districts (tambons), which are further subdivided into 30 villages (mubans). Chum Saeng is a township (thesaban tambon) which covers parts of tambons Chum Saeng and Phlong Ta Iam. There are a further four tambon administrative organizations (TAO).

Gallery

References

External links
amphoe.com

Wang Chan